Ibarrangelu is a town and municipality located in the province of Biscay, in the autonomous community of Basque Country, northern Spain. According to the 2019 census, it has 632 inhabitants.

References

External links
 IBARRANGELU in the Bernardo Estornés Lasa - Auñamendi Encyclopedia (Euskomedia Fundazioa) 

Municipalities in Biscay